Lake on the Mountain Provincial Park is a provincial park located in Prince Edward County, Ontario, Canada. The park has an area of 104 hectares. Other than a viewing platform, parking area, and an illustrated sign explaining the physical structure of the eponymous lake, there are no facilities in the park.

Often thought to have no visible source of water, it is actually fed by at least two small streams from the surrounding higher land, predominantly from the west though another enters near the southeast corner. The southeast supply is more of a seasonal spring runoff and by summer is sometimes completely dry. There is also a significant area of swamp to the southwest which would act as a reservoir for water that would eventually flow into the lake. Drainage of the lake occurs on the east side where a small stream flows down the cliff into Lake Ontario's Bay of Quinte. It is believed to be a collapsed doline (a type of sinkhole). It was believed to be bottomless by early settlers.

References

External links

Provincial parks of Ontario
Parks in Prince Edward County, Ontario
Protected areas established in 1957
1957 establishments in Ontario